Wisconsin Dells may refer to:

 Wisconsin Dells, Wisconsin
 The Dells of the Wisconsin River

See also
 Dell (disambiguation)
 Wisconsin (disambiguation)